Mill Creek Bridge may refer to:

Bridge in City of Wilkes-Barre, documented by the Historic American Engineering Record as "Mill Creek Bridge"
Mill Creek Covered Bridge, near Rockville, Indiana
Mill Creek Bridge (Cherokee, Iowa)
Mill Creek Bridge (Clarence, Iowa)
Mill Creek Park Suspension Bridge, Youngstown, Ohio
Mill Creek Bridge (The Dalles, Oregon), on the Historic Columbia River Highway